Thomas Boyce may refer to:

Tommy Boyce (1939–1994), American songwriter
Thomas Boyce (dramatist) (died 1793), English cleric and dramatist
W. Thomas Boyce, American pediatrician

See also
Boyce (disambiguation)